The 1923 Notre Dame Fighting Irish football team represented the University of Notre Dame during the 1923 college football season.

Key players included quarterback Harry Stuhldreher, halfback Don Miller, fullback Elmer Layden, center Adam Walsh, tackle Joe Bach, and guard Harvey Brown.

Schedule

References

Notre Dame
Notre Dame Fighting Irish football seasons
Notre Dame Fighting Irish football